David-Alexandre Dicanot (born 23 September 1973) is a Martiniquais retired footballer.

Career

After failing to make an appearance for Olympique de Marseille, one of the most successful French clubs, Dicanot played for French lower league clubs Istres, Martigues, Lorient, and Racing Club de France Football.

During 2001/02, Dicanot expressed desire to go abroad after experiencing unfulfilled promises while playing for Racing Club de France Football. Despite having contacts in Greece as well as England, he eventually went to Martinique, where he played for Club Franciscain and US Martinoise.

References

External links
 David Dicanot at Footballdatabase.eu

Living people
Martiniquais footballers
Association football defenders
1973 births
Martinique international footballers
FC Martigues players
FC Lorient players